Tammareddy Krishna Murthy (1920 – 16 September 2013) was an Indian film producer who worked in Telugu cinema. He received the Raghupathi Venkaiah Award from the Government of Andhra Pradesh in 2007.

Krishna Murthy started his career in the film industry as a production executive for films like Palletooru (1952), Rojulu Marayi (1955). Later, he turned a producer and established his own production company named Ravindra Art Pictures. He produced many notable films like Lakshadhikari (1963), Zamindar (1966), Bangaru Gajulu (1968), Dharma Daata (1970), Doctor Babu (1973).

Producer and director Tammareddy Bharadwaja is his son.

Early life
Tammareddy Krishna Murthy was born in Chinapalaparru village, Mudinepalli in Krishna district, Andhra Pradesh. He participated in Indian independence movement in his youth and was jailed. He liked Communist principles and actively participated in the works of Praja Natya Mandali.

Career 
Krishna Murthy initially worked as a tuition teacher for the children of cinema artists in Madras. Then he entered into films as a production executive and worked on films like Palletooru (1952), Rojulu Marayi (1955). Returning to Hyderabad, he worked for many successful films made by Sarathi Studios.

Later, he started his own production house titled Ravindra Art Pictures and made Lakshadhikari (1963) with N. T. Rama Rao in the lead role as his first production. It was a big success. He made Zamindar (1966) with Akkineni Nageswara Rao and many other films like Bangaru Gajulu (1968), Dharma Daata (1970), Sisindri Chitttibabu (1971), Dattaputhrudu (1972), Doctor Babu (1973), Chinnanati Kalalu (1975), Amma Nanna (1976), Love Marriage (1978), and Iddaru Kodukulu (1982).

Personal life 
Producer and director Tammareddy Bharadwaja, is his son. Tammareddy Lenin Babu, his other son, is also a film director. Krishna Murthy produced many films with Lenin Babu as a director.

Filmography
Production Executive
 Palletooru (1952)
 Rojulu Marayi (1955)
Producer
 Lakshadhikari (1963)
 Zamindar (1966)
 Bangaru Gaajulu (1968)
 Dharma Daata (1970)
 Sisindri Chittibabu (1971)
 Dattaputhrudu (1972)
 Doctor Babu (1973)
 Chinnanati Kalalu (1975)
 Amma Nanna (1976)
 Love Marriage (1978)
 Iddaru Kodukulu (1982)

Awards
Filmfare Best Film Award (Telugu) – Dharma Daata (1970).
Nandi Award for Third Best Feature Film – Bronze – Bangaru Gajulu (1968)
Raghupathi Venkaiah Award – 2007

See also
 Raghupathi Venkaiah Award

References

External links
 Krishnamurthy Tammareddy at IMDb.

Film producers from Andhra Pradesh
2013 deaths
1920 births
Telugu film producers
People from Krishna district
20th-century Indian businesspeople